Joseph Haroutunian (1904-1968) was an American Presbyterian theologian. He taught at McCormick Theological Seminary, and then at the University of Chicago, where he served as Cyrus H. McCormick Professor of Systematic Theology. He wrote widely on theological matters and on the role of the church in the world.

Selected works
 Piety Versus Moralism: The Passing of the New England Theology (1932) on New England theology
 Wisdom and Folly in Religion: A Study in Chastened Protestantism (1940)
 Lust For Power (1949)
 Calvin: Commentaries (1958) editor with Louise Pettibone Smith
 God with Us: A Theology of Transpersonal Life (1965)

References

1904 births
1968 deaths
American theologians
University of Chicago faculty